John Pollitt was a professional rugby league footballer who played in the 1930s and 1940s. He played at club level for Castleford (Heritage № 128), and Featherstone Rovers (Heritage № 150).

Playing career
John Pollitt made his début for Featherstone Rovers on Saturday 28 August 1937, he appears to have scored no drop-goals (or field-goals as they are currently known in Australasia), but prior to the 1974–75 season all goals, whether; conversions, penalties, or drop-goals, scored 2-points, consequently prior to this date drop-goals were often not explicitly documented, therefore '0' drop-goals may indicate drop-goals not recorded, rather than no drop-goals scored. In addition, prior to the 1949–50 season, the archaic field-goal was also still a valid means of scoring points.

References

External links
Search for "Pollitt" at rugbyleagueproject.org
John Pollitt Memory Box Search at archive.castigersheritage.com

Castleford Tigers players
English rugby league players
Featherstone Rovers players
Place of birth missing
Place of death missing
Year of birth missing
Year of death missing